John Francis Russell, 7th Earl Russell (born 19 November 1971) is a British photographer and Liberal Democrat politician.

Early life
The younger son of Conrad Russell, 5th Earl Russell, a professor of history at Yale University, and his wife Elizabeth Franklin Sanders, Russell is also a grandson of the philosopher Bertrand Russell and a great-great-grandson of John Russell, 1st Earl Russell, a Liberal Prime Minister of the United Kingdom. He was educated at the William Ellis School, Highgate.

As a teenager, he took adventure training holidays at Ty'n y Berth, a Wide Horizons centre in Wales, and he later became an advocate of providing disadvantaged children with such opportunities.

Career
Russell works as a freelance photographer, specializing in "political photography, event photography, charity commissions and landscapes". In 2006, he was in-house photographer for Total Politics magazine and also works for the Liberal Democrats, the London Wildlife Trust, other charities, and individuals. He publishes work at Zenfolio. 

Russell became chairman of the Lewisham Liberal Democrats and went on to serve as a Liberal Democrat councillor for Forest Hill on Lewisham Borough Council from 2006 to 2010, chairing its Overview and Scrutiny committee. In 2012 he was his party's candidate for the Greenwich and Lewisham seat on the Greater London Assembly. 

In 2006, Russell joined the board of Wide Horizons and chaired it from 2012. It went into administration and ceased trading in 2018. 

On 17 August 2014, on the death of his older brother Nicholas Russell, 6th Earl Russell, he succeeded as Earl Russell (1862) and as Viscount Amberley (1861), both in the peerage of the United Kingdom.

In the 2017 general election, he stood for the Liberal Democrats in Lewisham West and Penge, but Labour held the seat. In 2022 he stood unsuccessfully for election to Lewisham London Borough Council.

Arms

References

External links
 Professional photography site

1971 births
Living people
J
Earls Russell
Place of birth missing (living people)
Councillors in the London Borough of Lewisham
Liberal Democrats (UK) councillors